The 2012 international cricket season was from April 2012 to August 2012. One year after gaining the number-one ranking in the ICC Test Championship, England lost the ranking to South Africa in August 2012 following a 0–2 Test series defeat at home. Also in August 2012, England rose to number one in the ICC ODI Championship following ten consecutive ODI victories and the annual update of the rankings. The update also put South Africa and India within one rankings point behind England.

The previous number one ODI team was Australia, who slipped to number four after holding the top spot from September 2009. Shortly before they lost the ranking, they lost 0–4 in an ODI series in England. It marked the end to their era of dominance in ODI cricket which included three consecutive World Cup wins, two ICC Champions Trophy wins and finishing nine of the past eleven years with the number-one ranking. The annual update also put South Africa at the top of the ICC T20I Championship rankings, replacing England. However, the T20I rankings would change significantly as a result of the 2012 ICC World Twenty20 at the start of the following season.

Season overview

Pre-season rankings

Notes
 Zimbabwe is currently unranked in Tests, as it has played insufficient matches. It has 167 points and a rating of 42.
 Bangladesh is currently unranked in T20Is, as it has played insufficient matches.

May

West Indies in England

June

Pakistan in Sri Lanka

Zimbabwe Twenty20 Triangular Series

Although contested by three ICC full member nations, this tournament does not have Twenty20 International status, because it was organised outside of the ICC Future Tours Programme. The matches are considered to be first-class-equivalent Twenty20 matches.

Australia in Ireland

Australia in England

New Zealand vs West Indies in the United States

July

Afghanistan in Ireland

Canada in Scotland

New Zealand in West Indies

Bangladesh in Ireland

South Africa in England

India in Sri Lanka

Bangladesh vs Scotland in the Netherlands

Bangladesh in the Netherlands

August

New Zealand in India

Bangladesh in Zimbabwe
Bangladesh were scheduled to tour Zimbabwe in August 2012, but the tour has been postponed to April 2013 as the pitches at both Queen's Park Oval, Bulawayo and Harare Sports Club, Harare are being relaid.

Australia vs Afghanistan in the United Arab Emirates

Pakistan vs Australia in the United Arab Emirates

September

Trinidad Quadrangular T20

References

External links
2012 season in ESPN Cricinfo

2012 in cricket